The Dassault MD.415 Communauté was a 1950s French twin-engined light turboprop transport monoplane  built by Dassault Aviation. Only one prototype was built and flown.

Development
The Dassault company designed a light transport aircraft in the late 1950s, designated MD.415 and later named Communauté, as a potential replacement for the Dassault MD 315 Flamant in its trainer, command transport or ambulance aircraft roles. The Communauté was a cantilever low-wing monoplane with retractable tricycle landing gear with room for two crew and up to ten passengers. Powered by two wing-mounted Turbomeca Bastan turboprops, the prototype (F-WJDN) first flew on 10 May 1959.

The company also developed a military version designated the MD.410 Spirale. Retaining 90% commonality with the Communauté, the Spirale had  all the windows removed and transparent nose panels added. It also had provision for cannon or machine-gun armament and was fitted with under-wing hardpoints for weapons. It was intended that the Spirale could be used for close-support, reconnaissance or transport roles.

Neither the Communauté nor the Spirale received any production orders and a high-wing development designated Spirale III was also abandoned.

Variants

MD.410 Spirale
Prototype military version, one built, powered by two Turbomeca Astazou XIVD engines.
MD.415 Communauté
Prototype light transport, one built.
MD.415 Communauté A2 Proposed 14-seat variant.
MD.415M Diplomate
A proposed scaled-up executive transport variant.
MD.455 Spirale III
Proposed high-wing transport version, not built.

Specifications (MD-415 Communauté)

References

Bibliography
 

 
 
 
 
 
 
 
 

1950s French civil utility aircraft
Communaute
Low-wing aircraft
Aircraft first flown in 1959
Twin-turboprop tractor aircraft